Small White House is a 1990 American drama film directed and produced by Richard Newton. The musical score was composed by Nicolas Dodet. The film stars Enrico Boetcher, Brian Doyle-Murray, Richard Duardo, Heather Elias, Shahira Eversole and Kathy Foy in the lead roles.

Plot
The film is about a fictional version of a love triangle be JFK, Jackie O., and Marilyn Monroe.

Cast
 Enrico Boetcher
 Brian Doyle-Murray
 Richard Duardo
 Heather Elias
 Shahira Eversole
 Kathy Foy
 Charles C. Hill
 Orb Kamm
 Christina Kuta

References

External links
 

1990 films
1990 drama films
American drama films
Films shot in California
1990s English-language films
1990s American films